James Anthony Bowen (born 15 March 1979) is an English author based in London. His memoirs A Street Cat Named Bob, The World According to Bob and A Gift from Bob, were international best-sellers. A film based on the first two books was released in 2016 and a sequel was released in 2020. Bowen now dedicates his time to helping numerous charities that involve homelessness, literacy, and animal welfare.

Early life 
Bowen was born in Surrey in March 1979. Following his parents' divorce, three years later he moved to Australia with his mother. As they moved frequently, Bowen seldom made friends and was often bullied at school. He later dropped out of education in his second year of high school, becoming a self-confessed "tearaway kid".

In 1997, aged 17 years old, he moved to the United Kingdom to seek his fortune desperately trying to make something of himself while he stayed with his half-sister and her husband in London. Tensions arose and the arrangement did not last. His pursuit of his singing career quickly faded as the band members drifted apart.

In time, he began sleeping on the streets. For the next few years, Bowen either slept in the streets or stayed in shelters, most of the time terrified of his surroundings. He began begging, and using heroin to deal with the pain from being homeless.

Meeting Bob 
One evening he returned home to find a ginger cat in the hallway of his building. Assuming it belonged to another resident, he simply returned to his flat. When the cat was still there the following day, and the day after that, Bowen became concerned and discovered the cat was wearing no collar or ID tag, was too thin, had a very unhealthy coat, scratches on its face and an infected wound on his leg. Bowen checked with other residents to see if the stray belonged to any of them, and when none of them claimed ownership of the animal Bowen decided to help the cat.

According to the account in A Street Cat Named Bob, Bowen took the cat to the nearby Blue Cross pop up veterinary check up vans, which provided antibiotics to treat the infected wound (that he purchased with his last twenty pounds, which he had been saving for food). To make sure the cat received the full two-week course of medication, Bowen took him in for a time, while he continued to look for the stray's owner. When he couldn't find any information, he released the cat back on to the street, hoping he'd find his own way home. Instead, the cat began to follow Bowen around, even following him onto the bus when he left to go busking. Concerned that the cat had nowhere else to go, Bowen took him in permanently, naming him Bob after the character Killer BOB from the television drama Twin Peaks. 

James decided to quit the heroin and go on a methadone programme In spring 2007, when he realised he wanted to better himself for his beloved cat, Bob.

Bowen was enrolled in a methadone programme, begging and busking in Covent Garden, and living in a supported housing programme in Tottenham, London.

Bob constantly followed James when he was going to work, he got him a harness for safety and allowed him to come along to his regular spots in Covent Garden and Piccadilly Circus, travelling in the window seat of the number 73 bus. The public reaction was positive and the pair became locally well known, their visibility increasing still further when Bowen began selling The Big Issue. The public began uploading videos of Bowen and Bob to YouTube, and tourists would visit Covent Garden to see them. During this time, Bowen decided to conclude his methadone treatment. He credits this development to Bob, saying "I believe it came down to this little man. He came and asked me for help, and he needed me more than I needed to abuse my own body. He is what I wake up for every day now. He’s definitely given me the right direction to live my life."

Bob was kept as an indoor cat in his later life, occasionally being walked in his harness in a local park by James. A purpose-built catio was commissioned by James to allow Bob secure access to their garden. 

On 13 June 2020 Bob was fed in the kitchen of their home in Surrey, and last seen at approximately 11:00 p.m., before James noticed he was missing half an hour later. The cause of death was determined to be haematoma from a head-on collision with a car, the driver of which remains unknown. He was thought to be aged at least 14 to 15 years old. Bob had escaped through a skylight that had mistakenly been left ajar.

Books 
A number of books have been published about Bowen and Bob.

A Street Cat Named Bob 

Bowen and Bob's public appearances attracted the attention of the Islington Tribune, which first published his story in September 2010. This was read by Mary Pachnos, the literary agent responsible for the UK rights to John Grogan's Marley and Me, who introduced Bowen to the writer Garry Jenkins. The pair produced an outline for a book which Pachnos used to secure a book deal with the publishers Hodder & Stoughton. Since its publication the book has sold over 1 million copies in the UK alone, has been translated into 30 languages, and spent over 76 weeks at the top of The Sunday Times bestseller list in both its hardback and paperback editions. A Street Cat Named Bob: And How He Saved My Life was published in the US on 30 July 2013, and entered The New York Times best-seller list at No 7. A film of the same name was released in late 2016, starring Luke Treadaway as Bowen, and with several cats, including the real Bob, playing the part of the cat.

The World According to Bob 
The World According to Bob continues the story of Bowen and Bob's lives on the street, including the period leading up to their meeting with his agent Mary Pachnos. It was released on 4 July 2013 and was also a number one book on The Sunday Times bestseller list.

Bob: No Ordinary Cat 
Bob: No Ordinary Cat is a version of the book A Street Cat Named Bob re-written specifically for children. It was released on Valentine's Day 2013.

Where in the World Is Bob?
Where in The World Is Bob? is a picture book in which readers have to spot Bob, James and assorted other items in scenes around the world. It mirrors Bob's travels in a blog, Around the World in 80 Bobs, where fans of the book take photographs of the famous cat at various locations around the world. It was published in October 2013.

My Name Is Bob 
My Name is Bob is a picture book for young children, written by Bowen with Garry Jenkins and illustrated by Gerald Kelley, published by Random House in the UK in April 2014. It imagines Bob's life prior to him meeting Bowen.

For the Love of Bob
For the Love of Bob is a children's version of The World According to Bob and the sequel to Bob: No Ordinary Cat. It was released on 3 July 2014.

A Gift from Bob
"A Gift from Bob" is a short story about Bowen and Bob's final Christmas on the streets together. According to publishers Hodder & Stoughton, the book reveals "how Bob helped James through one of his toughest times – providing strength, friendship and inspiration but also teaching him important lessons about the true meaning of Christmas along the way." It was published on 9 October 2014, and reached No. 8 on the Sunday Times best-seller list. In October 2019, it was announced that a film adaptation of the book, directed by Charles Martin Smith and written by Garry Jenkins, would be going into production in late 2019 with a view to a cinema release in 2020.

Bob to the Rescue
Bob to the Rescue is a second children's picture book, written again with Garry Jenkins and illustrated by Gerald Kelley. It was published by Random House in September 2014.

The Little Book of Bob
The Little Book of Bob: Life Lessons from a Street-Wise Cat collects together pieces of wisdom Bowen has accumulated during his years sharing his life with his 'streetwise' cat. It was published by Hodder & Stoughton on 1 November 2018.

Music 

In addition to his books, James Bowen has released music regarding his story and relationship with Bob. The charity singles And Then Came Bob and Time To Move On were released by Macaferri Music in 2018. Both tracks were mixed at Broadway Studio and mastered at Abbey Road Studios in London.

The track And Then Came Bob was composed by the songwriting trio of Roger Ferris, Glo Macari and Dominic Ferris, and Time To Move On was composed by Bowen and fellow busker Henry Facey.

Ferris also featured in and produced both tracks, and can be seen producing and mixing the track with Bob playing on the audio desk.

Both singles were launched at a ticketed live event in November 2018 at Phoenix Gardens in Covent Garden, where Bowen was accompanied by Dominic Ferris & Henry Facey.

Profits from And Then Came Bob were donated to The Big Issue Foundation, supporting homeless people across the UK. Bowen and his team made a bid to get And Then Came Bob to a UK Christmas No. 1 in 2018.

Film adaptations 

A film was optioned by London-based Shooting Script Films, and its producer Adam Rolston, in March 2014. In August 2015, Variety announced that Luke Treadaway was to star in the film, and that Roger Spottiswoode was to direct, with shooting in London to begin in October. During production, it was revealed that Bob played himself in the vast majority of the film's scenes. The film was released in the UK in November 2016.

A sequel to the 2016 film, titled A Gift from Bob, was released on 6 November 2020, with both Luke Treadaway and Bob himself reprising their roles. Bob died in an accident in June 2020, approximately six months after filming was completed. The film's end credits carry a dedication in his memory.

Awards 
A Street Cat Named Bob was nominated for the UK's National Book Awards in the Popular Non-Fiction category in November 2012. In March 2014, A Street Cat Named Bob was listed at No. 7 on a list of the most inspiring teenage books as part of a poll for World Book Day.

References

External links 
 
 

1979 births
Living people
21st-century English memoirists
Animal welfare workers
English buskers
English male non-fiction writers
Homeless people
English emigrants to Australia